Market Street is a tram stop in Zone 1 of Greater Manchester's Metrolink light rail system. It is located on Market Street, in  Manchester city centre, England. It opened on 27 April 1992 as part of Phase 1 of Metrolink's expansion.

Originally the stop in Market Street had one platform and handled only northbound trams to Bury Interchange, with High Street tram stop a short distance away handling southbound trams from Bury. When Market Street was pedestrianised, High Street stop was closed, and Market Street was rebuilt as an island platform to handle trams in both directions. The rebuilt stop opened on 10 August 1998. It was rebuilt once again in 2015 with a new canopy. The stop is one of the most used on the Metrolink network.

Services

Service pattern 

At peak times (07:15 – 19:30 Monday to Friday, 09:30 – 18:30 Saturday):

5 trams per hour to Altrincham
10 trams per hour to Bury
5 trams per hour to Manchester Airport
5 trams per hour to Piccadilly
5 trams per hour to Victoria

Offpeak (all other times during operational hours):

5 trams per hour to Bury
5 trams per hour to Manchester Airport
5 trams per hour to Piccadilly
5 trams per hour to Victoria

Gallery

References

External links

Tram times and station information for Market Street Metrolink station from Manchester Metrolink
Metrolink city centre map

Tram stops in Manchester
Tram stops on the Altrincham to Bury line